Gudermessky District (Gümsen khoşt) is an administrative and municipal district (raion), one of the fifteen in the Chechen Republic, Russia. It is located in the east of the republic. Its administrative center is the town of Gudermes (which is not administratively a part of the district). Population:  71,082 (2002 Census);

Administrative and municipal status
Within the framework of administrative divisions, Gudermessky District is one of the fifteen in the republic. The town of Gudermes serves as its administrative center, despite being incorporated separately as a town of republic significance—an administrative unit with the status equal to that of the districts.

As a municipal division, the district is incorporated as Gudermessky Municipal District, with the town of republic significance of Gudermes being incorporated within it as Gudermesskoye Urban Settlement.

Health care

State health facilities are represented by one central district hospital, a town hospital in Gudermes, and four district hospitals in Oyskhara, Engel-Yurt, Gerzel-Aul, and Koshkeldy. District state health care services here are reported to be among the best in the Republic; birth rates are also the highest in Gudermes (27.0). There are registered HIV cases in the district and a high prevalence of tuberculosis.

References

Notes

Sources

Districts of Chechnya